Molecular Medicine is a peer-reviewed open access medical journal published by The Feinstein Institute for Medical Research. It was established in 1994 by the Picower Institute for Medical Research, which had been established in 1991 by Anthony Cerami with funding from Jeffry Picower which eventually was absorbed into Feinstein.

It is published in paper format six times annually. Manuscripts are posted online when they are accepted for publication. The journal covers research on the molecular pathogenesis of disease and translation of this knowledge into specific molecular tools for diagnosis, treatment, and prevention. It offers a biweekly podcast "Mollie Medcast", launched in 2007, which includes brief summaries of recent articles.

In 2013 Feinstein began giving an annual award named after Cerami through the journal; the winner receives $20,000 and the offer to publish an autobiographical piece about their research and what drives it in the journal.

As of 2014, the editor-in-chief is Betty Diamond. Molecular Medicine is indexed by PubMed and the Web of Science. According to the Journal Citation Reports, its 2013 impact factor is 4.824.

References

link to the journal, Molecular Medicine published by BMC-SpringerNature - https://molmed.biomedcentral.com/

External links
https://molmed.biomedcentral.com/

Open access journals
Publications established in 1994
General medical journals
English-language journals
Bimonthly journals